NFU Mutual (NFUM) is a UK insurance composite, its directors and executives are directly answerable to customers/policyholders (who own the business) for conduct of business as NFUM is and mutual and so has no shareholders to hold it to account. The full name of the organisation is National Farmers' Union Mutual Insurance Society Limited.

The Financial Services Compensation Scheme covers protection for consumers should the business fail and be unable to meet its obligations. The business is authorised and regulated by the Financial Conduct Authority and the Prudential Regulation Authority, with complaints oversight available via the Financial Ombudsman Service. NFU Mutual Risk Management Services Limited are not regulated.

Currently, headquarters are in the village of Tiddington, Warwickshire.

History 
The Midlands Farmers' Mutual Insurance Society Ltd formed in 1910 by seven farmers in Warwickshire. John William Lowe was the first Chair. James Robertson Black was the first secretary. His farmhouse was the first office. In 1912 he became the inaugural Managing Director. He served the society for 42 years becoming vice-Chair in 1946, a post he held to his 1952 death. The first accounts (1911) show income of £311 and profit of £16. In 1919, premiums stood at £4,345 and profit at £1,825.

As early as 1912, the farmers' union in Lincolnshire had approached the directors for advice about forming a mutual insurance company. They were advised to join the mutual in the Midlands that was already in existence.

In 1919, the society became the official insurer of the National Farmers' Union (itself established in 1908) and changed its name to the one it bears now. Ralph Chisholm, joined the staff during this period and went on to be the first CEO.

NFUM exploited the First World War's a rapid increase in the amount of land in cultivation, achieving a 50 per cent increase in income.

In 1920, offices were established in Stratford-upon-Avon. One of the first directors was Sir Basil Brooke. He went on to be Prime Minister of Northern Ireland.

In 1928, NFU Mutual successfully applied to the High Court to set up a life assurance business. In its first full year wrote more than £100,000 of sums assured. In 1928 the Mutual also set up its final-salary pension scheme for the benefit of its employees. By 1930, income from premiums had risen to just under £316,000 and the Mutual had eight branches.

Mortgage loans from the business to directors of the company were discovered to have been provided in the 1920s. These loans were immediately repaid on the discovery and "the matter was closed.

There are examples of NFUM operating policies between 1930 and 1970, such as holding a ball.

During this period NFUM employed Sidney Carter to run a film unit. Anyone attending his film shows would be educated by current affairs films and entertained by dramas and documentaries about how they could be covered by insurance, provided of course by NFU Mutual"

By 1940/41, over 100,000 farmers held policies with NFUM and premium income reached £1million with assets at £2million.

In 1933 taxation was introduced to cover the trading results of mutuals, this was reversed in 1944 when a tax case went to the House of Lords and the intention of the statute was defeated.  The Finance Act of 1964 sought to reverse this defeat, and Edmund Chaumeton, the company secretary, led efforts to oppose regularising mutual tax affairs, a task that "every year successive governments [have been] expected to put it back in place".

During World War Two, a mutual employee named Arthur Scarf was awarded a posthumous Victoria Cross. Scarf came from a Lincolnshire farming family and worked for the Mutual's claims department between the wars.

In the 1960s, NFU Mutual's assets reached £50m. A significant UK outbreak of foot and mouth disease in 1967 saw NFUM decline to take any new business for that cover. Work with reinsurers enabled NFUM to offer renewal to members who already had cover.

In the late 1980s the Mutual determined to move beyond farming; in 1998, the Board put before the members the Articles to enable unrestricted access to all NFUM products which was adopted. A need to reassure NFUM's established farming base resulted in a product called 'Mutual Advantage' being set up, NFU members.

Around the year 2000, a number of attempts were made to create shareholder ownership and accountability to the NFU Mutual.

Former NFUM director John Murray initially approached the five venture capitalists in the hope of launching a bid.   One of the reasons this was advanced the opinion that the company was "eroding its value by selling insurance to non-farming customers at knockdown rates"; at the time, windfalls for members of between £20,000 and £25,000 were anticipated. Commenting to the House of Commons Treasury Select Committee on the possibility of demutualisation, Andrew Young, the then managing director said:In our view, members of a mutual should ... decide how the business is run, and if they are not satisfied, they should get rid of the Board and the management rather than demutualise ... current governance mechanisms give ample opportunity to do thatBy 2000, Group premium income passed £1billion.

The post of Group Chief Executive was created in 2005, with Ian Geden the first to hold this office.

In 2002, Andrew Young retired and was succeeded by Ian Geden, who came from a farming family near Stratford-upon-Avon and had joined the Mutual as a professional trainee in 1969. He became Group Chief Executive in 2005 when that post was created. During his term, the general insurance premium income grew from £603m to £944m.

In 2007, flooding brought more than 13,000 claims costing close to £100m, making it the most expensive weather event to that date.

In 2008, Lindsay Sinclair became Chief Executive (the first such appointment from outside NFUM), There were reports that NFU Group Secretaries were dissatisfied with his leadership and decision to move away from the farming customer base In 2013, Bite Back, a forum for Animal Liberation Front (ALF) activists claimed to hacked the company's records; NFUM denied the attack.

In 2015 NFUM asked the Prudential Regulation Authority to make an exception and reduce the scale of reserves required for it under Solvency II Regulations, this requested reduced solvency obligation is still in force for NFUM.

This concerns the amount of capital that insurance companies must hold to reduce the risk of insolvency.

A swimming pool for the staff at head office was closed and filled in in 2016, making way for rooms to do work rather than leisure in.In March 2021, Nick Turner took over as the current NFUM's Chief Executive.

NFU Mutual had shared in losses of £58million connected with the collapse of Made.com, as reported in August 2022 in The Times. NFUM was named Which? 'Insurance Brand of the Year' for 2022'. Later that year, the business stated that the drought of that summer has seen a huge growth in (to in excess of 500) farm and combine harvester fires reported to it for claims and settlement - such fires cost the mutual around £100 million in the previous year, when incidents were lower. The number of fires was subsequently revised upwards to over 800.  That year the Annual report stated:[A]Principal Risk and Uncertainty, Strategic [is that] NFU Mutual’s customer base changes substantially beyond expectations Unexpected changes to NFU Mutual’s current or target customer base which impact on insurable risks, including changes to the farming industry or other significant target trade sectors, customer demographic or behavioural changes. This could be caused by events including a reputation-damaging event impacting our standing in the farming community.Following the invasion of Ukraine, NFUM stated it would divest from Russian holdings as soon as practically possible. The business represented it had limited exposure to Russian assets, and stated that therefore the impact on customers and portfolio performance would be limited.

Affiliates and agents

Agencies 
NFU Mutual sells policies predominantly through a network of agents. Agents were traditionally Group Secretaries of the NFU. The Union, as employer, paid them a salary and the Mutual paid them commission. At the end of 2018, NFU Mutual had over 3,800 employees, and 654 agents working out of 310 offices.

Farming Unions 
NFU Mutual has made financial contributions to UK farming unions during that time. For example, in 2021, the insurer donated >£7m to the UK's farming unions.

NFU Mutual is the official insurer of the main farming unions of the UK, with these associations beginning as follows: National Farmers' Union of England and Wales (1919);  NFU Scotland (1922); Ulster Farmers' Union (1930);  Manx NFU (1947); Scottish Crofting Federation (1986).  In 1922, NFUM became the insurer to NFU of Scotland; the Ulster Farmers' Union followed in 1930.

Services 
NFU Mutual offers personal insurance products such as home, private motor, pet and travel. They also offer agricultural and commercial insurance to business customers of various sizes. In 1928, NFU Mutual set up a final-salary pension scheme for employees and establish a life assurance business, which wrote more than £100,000 of sums assured in year one.

Diverse life insurance products including term assurance are offered to the market by NFU Mutual working with AIG.

The business offers various investment and pension products and sells financial advice.

Financial performance 
The business currently underwrites around £1.825billion in annual general insurance premiums for UK policyholders.  At the end of 2021, its total funds under management were £22.2bn.

An underwriting loss of £89m was made inn 2021, the most recent year for which figures are available though the Group achieved an overall profit of £182m.

The business reported losses of £143m for 2020 and an underwriting profit of £109m. In 2019, the Group made profits of £573m and reported an underwriting profit of £167m.

Losses of £290m (with an underwriting profit of £142m) occurred in 2018. That year, Nick Turner's "new business engine" also had to downgrade targets by £7million pounds."

In 2013, the NFU was placed in a table produced by the Association of British Insurers for pensions annuities.

In 2018, customer retention on renewal had stood at of 95.5%, but in 2022 it stood at to 82.6% in respect of motor customers.

Executive Pay 
The issue of director and executive pay has received attention through time.

For example, in 2011, with the Insurance Times quoting an observer as saying: "Ian Leech, sales and agency director, received a mere 21 per cent increase... because he retired two thirds of the way through the calendar year...  More recently, in 2022, Irish Farmers Journal reported financial director Richard Morley pocketed £738,000 a year from the business while the current chief executive, Nick Turner, currently CEO, took remuneration of over £1.04 million from the business in 2021. The former CEO, Lindsay Sinclair, took £879,444 from the business in 2021. Sinclair's drawings were over £2.5 million annually before he left, a matter about which concerns were renewed in 2019.

Long Term Incentive Plan (LTIP) 
An Long Term Incentive Plan grant is made each year with performance conditions covering a three year period. Under the rules of the plan the maximum grant for the CEO is an additional 150% of base pay, and 108% for executive directors.

The grant vests three years later, but (it is said) only if performance conditions have been met.  Clawback or scale back can occur if:

 performance is mis-stated
 misconduct comes to light
 there has been a major failure of management resulting in substantial damage to the business or reputation of NFUM.

Director fees 
NFUM does not prescribe a cap on fees or operate a standard percentage increase, and non-executive directors typically take in excess of £70,000 a year in remuneration. Of the more senior executives and directors, the chairman, Jim McLaren, took over £200,000 in remuneration, in 2021.  Non-Executive Directors no longer  accrue pension benefits with NFU Mutual, but some former Non-Executive Directors (or their widows) are still receiving a pension, on an ex gratia, non-contractual and unfunded basis.  The total cost of these pensions for14 former Directors or widows in 2021 was £211,437.91 (2020: £218,841). Steve Bower has a pension of  £2,665,600 through the Group’s Retirement Benefit Scheme (2021).

Governance

Membership 
There are around 900,000 members of the NFU Mutual. As NFU Mutual has no shareholders, it represents that a proportion of its profits, if any, are returned to policyholder members in the form of an adjustment on quoted premiums of renewing customers. A claimed discount of between 8.5% and 13.5% (2022/2023) is currently asserted by NFU Mutual (without any external adjudication), which the business brands "Mutual Bonus".

Membership is conferred automatically on holding a policy, but under the Articles of Association the Designated Officer, or the board, may deny membership to any individual for "any reason", thereby expelling them from the governance of the business.

Annual General Meeting 
Under NFU Mutual's articles of association, each policy generates a distinct right to speak and vote at the Annual General Meeting (AGM), scrutinise the accounts, and hold the management to account, as well as an ownership right in the business.

The AGM is generally held at the British Motor Museum at Gaydon,  Warwickshire and is open to all policyholder members.

Complaints 

NFU Mutual reported complaints in the first half of 2022. This accounted for 2.75 per 1000 insurance policies, 0.85 per 1000 life and pension policies, and 0.69 per investment policies.

Senior leadership team 
The board (as of  November 2022) consisted of the following people: Jim McLaren MBE (chair), Nick Turner (CEO), Richard Morley (Finance Director []) Steve Bower (Customer Services Director), Nick Watson (Sales & Agency Director) -- the non-executive directors are John Deane, Brian Duffin OBE, Ali Capper, Christine Kennedy OBE Jon Bailie, David Roper; these individuals "are responsible for the overall direction of the Company and setting the Company’s values and standards". Beyond this the executive team has these additional people: Gina Fusco (Strategy & Marketing Director), Trisha Jones (HR Director), Tim Mann (IT Director), Iain Baker (Risk Director).   The NFUM’s current Group Head of Legal and Company Secretary is Jim Creechan, he succeed Bill Cooper in 2002, who died in 2022.

NFUM's Amanda Mason, chairs the Association of British Insurers's influential conduct regulation committee, and the NFUM have just recruited the ABI's Head of Conduct Regulation to go and work for them.

Subsidiaries and acquisitions 
A subsidiary, Avon Insurance, was established in 1925 to provide insurance to non-farming customers, and later specialised in personal accident insurance. Avon closed to new business in 2013.  The establishment of this enterprise was opposed by NFU hierarchy and the NFUM directors were required to agree that they would "consult on such matters in future".

In 1929, NFUM bought another farming insurance company, Northern Farmers. In 1930, it bought a printing business, Edward Fox & Son.

Between 1948 and 1974, NFUM had operations alongside unions in Central and East Africa, including what was then known as Rhodesia and Kenya. Operations in Kenya ceased in 1964 and Rhodesia in 1974.

NFU Mutual acquired the Islands Insurance Group in 1987, providing access to NFU Mutual products for customers in the Channel Islands.

NFU Mutual Risk Management Services Ltd is a health and safety company set up in 1997 that work with a variety of sectors including farming and manufacturing. NFU members receive a discount on some Risk Management Services through Union Advantage.

NFU Mutual Direct was set up in 1996 to provide telephone and internet call centre services.

Charitable activities

NFU Mutual Charitable Trust 
NFU Mutual set up a Charitable Trust in 1998 to deal with need concerned with 'agriculture, rural development and insurance.'

In 2022 it pledged to donate £1m to 'national and regional charities' as part of NFU Mutual's overall donation of £3.25m to charity. In 2022 it donated £30,000 to help the NFU support and expand its education projects.

In the past 24 years the independent charity has distributed funds averaging around £250,000 per year.

In 2022 the NFUM Charitable Trust pledged £150,000 to Disasters Emergency Committee's Ukraine Appeal.

Farm Safety Foundation 
In 2014, NFUM set up the Farm Safety Foundation, an independent charity to help young farmers challenge their behaviours and change their attitude to farm safety.

The Foundation aims is to have zero avoidable deaths on farms and run an annual Mind Your Head campaign concerning mental health issues.

Agency Giving Fund 
In 2020, NFU Mutual set up a fund for its Agents to use in order to distribute money to charities in their local communities. A total of £1m was distributed in the first year.

In 2021, the Agency Giving Fund distributed £2m to charities and in 2022 it will distribute £1.92m.

Property dealing and development 
In 2021, NFU Mutual bought a shed near Milnrow for £27 million, it also committed to spending £100 million on 6 sheds near Clowes.

Also in 2021, NFU Mutual's plans to develop a giant warehouse 14 metres from one residential property in Witney, with trucks coming and going at all times of night were branded "completely unacceptable" by residents and attracted over 190 objections. Nevertheless, in April 2022 NFU Mutual's management allocated in excess of a further £20 million of members' funds to this speculative investment with its commercial partner Tungsten.

In March 2022 plans were announced to build a speculative £34 million shed in Staffordshire.  Work has since began on the shed.

In April 2022, a shed was traded with Valor for £50 million.

In July 2022, NFU Mutual withdrew from a number of the shed schemes selling eight of them to American-based investment firm Barings LLC for £234m. Commenting on the transaction, Bearing said they had picked up the property following a "pricing shift in the sector, [in a deal that represented a] short-term relative value opportunity" for them.

In October 2022, along with partners Apache, Harrison Street, NFUM obtained a loan of £70 million from Deutsche Bank to finance a £150 million build-to-rent development in Liverpool. A 325 rental-home unit neighbourhood in Liverpool was funded with NFUM capital and loans and opened in late 2022.

HQ building 
The head offices are at Tiddington. The 1984 building was designed by David Lloyd Jones for RMJM. It was one of the first to be designed around environmental sustainability.

Research and reports 
Each year, NFU Mutual issues a Rural Crime report based on its claims data.

In October 2022 the business released research indicating their customers had "put a hold on their [investment] plans while...  assessing uncertainty overshadowing" them.

Notable people 

During World War II, Arthur Scarf, an employee was awarded a posthumous Victoria Cross. A former First World War pilot, George Lindsay, was NFU Mutual General Manager between 1944 and 1955.

A former chairman of NFUM is Lord Curry of Kirkharle.

Controversies

System glitches 
In December 2020, the National Association of Group Secretaries ("NAGS") recorded the CEO, Nick Turner, had put on record a report from the agents stated: "System glitches have been identified where business client customer care flags are not being pulled through on... reports or even being picked up.... The suggested workaround is not acceptable, and we [Agents] are pushing back hard..,training is incredibly dry."

Business interruption and Covid-19 
During the 2020 pandemic, NFUM claimed it had no liability to meet claims for COVID-19 related business interruption. This has since emerged to be untrue in some cases and still contested in others; more specifically, some policy holders who were initially wrongfully denied payments have already had to be paid, while other policyholders are bringing proceedings against the business on the basis that the Financial Conduct Authority test case in 2020 did not conclude all of the issues. One policyholder involved said early on: "They have quite happily taken the premiums for the last 15 years but the one time I need it I'm not going to get any help off them ... It's disgusting". By April 2020, the mutual's claims not to owe these policyholders were being questioned in evidence to the House of Commons Treasury Select Committee.

In 2022 (following the handing down of the UK Supreme Court decision in the FCA test), plans to bring proceedings in a group action against NFUM with Penningtons Manches Cooper LLP acting as solicitors were announced. A lawyer involved said: "We expect this represents only a very small number of potentially hundreds of NFUM policyholders possibly affected". Commenting on this situation an impacted policyholder has said: "[i]n good faith, we paid our premiums to NFU Mutual for years to protect us ... we reached for the comfort and the security of the longstanding relationship with NFU Mutual and it turned to total ash."

In a Chartered Institute of Insurance podcast at the beginning of the pandemic in May 2020, a director of the NFU Mutual, Nick Turner (at the time sales and agency director, and subsequently CEO) stated that:Trust is important everywhere in insurance ... We have a product which is a promise essentially ... So many people's lives and businesses have been affected in tragic and possibly permanent ways... If you haven't written a policy wording very precisely to protect the insurance company and bring clarity to the consumer, then that is where the problems lie... We [will] have to work to renew trust with certain customers [who feel they have been let down], it will be challenging this is going to run and run  ... if [the issues around policies we have sold have put policyholders] into incredibly difficult positions or even administration, nothing is going to put a smile on [their] face Turner accepted that putting policyholders in this situation was likely to have harmed their welfare and mental health in this same podcast, a point reiterated in commentary by Jim McLaren, as chairman, in another podcast: Interviewer: lots of people who have got diversified farm businesses are really feeling that at the moment, aren't they? Jim McLaren: They certainly are.  And these diversified income streams have become, you know, a major source of income to many farms, and increasingly so.  So when that is... stopped it can have a real impact... it's really traumatic at the moment, isn't it... And you mentioned mental health and it's a crucial area and one that's often overlooked other than by those who are suffering from real mental health challenges.  And again, the Mutual recognises that.
In November 2020, following criticism in the press and campaigning, and complaints from policy holders and stakeholders, the company's conduct in deducting COVID-19 support grants from its payments triggered by COVID-19 were called into question in debate in the House of Commons with John Glen MP stating:I am aware that NFU Mutual has continued to make such deductions. As stated in my letter, these grants are intended to provide emergency support to businesses at this time of crisis, and it is the Government's firm expectation that they are not to be deducted from business interruption insurance claims... The FCA [Financial Conduct Authority] has also made it clear that it may intervene and take further actions where firms do not appear to be meeting the FCA's expectations and treating their customers fairlyThis conduct was subsequently highlighted in House of Commons Library Briefing Number 8917.

Climate Change 
In 2020, Ethical Consumer returned a verdict on NFU Mutual in a study examining it against environmental and carbon assessment criteria, including commitments to fossil-free investing, having targets in line with international climate agreements and visible public policies that report on emissions from investments, and criticized them for "just talking about the climate impact of their offices" rather than the far more significant impact of their investments. NFU Mutual responded saying: "We avoid areas we consider harmful such as predatory lenders, certain munitions, and climate-unfriendly companies with no plans to help decarbonisation."  Two years later they announced a carbon reduction strategy.

Frauds
In 2011, an employee of NFU Mutual insurance, Gordon Murray, was jailed for a £400,000 fraud. In 2018, Iain Wishlade, an NFU Mutual employee was also jailed for a £129,000 fraud.

There have been periodic frauds on the NFUM by its policy holder members The most serious of these saw the perpetrator jailed for 20 years following the arrangement of an explosion which injured 81 people.

In 2022 NFUM won several industry fraud awards.

Noteworthy court cases 
In 2010, the NFU Mutual brought an action in the High Court, making a claim against HSBC. In the case, (The National Farmers Union Mutual Insurance Society Limited v HSBC Insurance (UK) Limited [2010] EWHC 773 (Comm)) the NFU Mutual had sought to require HSBC to pay a contribution to the more than £1.8 costs of fire damage to a property that NFU Mutual was insuring for a purchaser after the exchange of contracts. The NFU Mutual lost the case.

In Smith (Leah) v National Farmers Union Mutual Insurance Society Limited and Robinsons Services Limited [2019] NIQB 37, the company sought to deny liability for an accident sustained in the course of an employee's attendance at work, but the court found against the company.

In 2016 NFU Mutual sought to force a policyholder to meet a £128,000 bill for damage to a cottage from a water burst, even though she was covered by an insurance policy. The NFU Mutual lost this case in court and was also ordered by Mr Justice Holgate to pay a £100,000 legal costs bill on top of the costs of the damage.

References
 Victor Head; A Triumph of Hope, The Story of the National Farmers Union Mutual Insurance Society Limited; The National Farmers Union; 1985

External links
 Fillings history at Companies House
 Transitional Deduction Measure on Technical Provisions granted to the company to the Bank of England Predental Regulation Authority 
 
 NFU Mutual complaints data

Insurance companies of the United Kingdom
Mutual insurance companies
Agricultural insurance
Financial services companies established in 1910
1910 establishments in England
Companies based in Stratford-upon-Avon